Seasons: Falling is the sixth album released by Portuguese pop–rock singer David Fonseca. It was released in Portugal on 21 September 2012 to critical and commercial acclaim.

Track listing

2012 albums
David Fonseca albums